Darijo Pecirep (born 14 August 1991) is a Bosnian professional footballer who plays as a striker for Šibenik.

Career
Pecirep began playing football with his hometown club Kiseljak in 2008, before moving to Austria in 2010 with the reserves of LASK. He moved to Simmeringer in 2012, before moving to Slovakia with the club DAC 1904. He returned to Austria the following season with Wallern, and then played in the Austrian Football Bundesliga with Rheindorf Altach in 2014. He returned to Wallern in 2015, and then moved to cross-town rivals Blau-Weiß Linz in 2016. He had a short stint with semi-pro club Wiener Sport-Club, before moving to Ried in 2018. He transferred to Austria Klagenfurt in 2019, and helped them get promoted to the Austrian Football Bundesliga for the 2021-22 season. He transferred to the Croatian club HNK Šibenik in June 2022.

Personal life
Pecirep was born in Kiseljak, Bosnia and Herzegovina and is of Croatian descent. He is married to wife Kristiana, and had his first child in October 2021.

References

External links
 
 OEFB Profile

1991 births
Living people
People from Kiseljak
Bosnia and Herzegovina footballers
Croats of Bosnia and Herzegovina
FC DAC 1904 Dunajská Streda players
SV Wallern players
SC Rheindorf Altach players
Floridsdorfer AC players
FC Blau-Weiß Linz players
Wiener Sport-Club players
SK Austria Klagenfurt players
HNK Šibenik players
Croatian Football League players
Austrian Football Bundesliga players
2. Liga (Austria) players
Austrian Regionalliga players
Association football forwards
Bosnia and Herzegovina expatriate footballers
Bosnia and Herzegovina expatriate sportspeople in Austria
Bosnia and Herzegovina expatriate sportspeople in Slovakia
Expatriate footballers in Austria
Expatriate footballers in Slovakia